Sir William Sarsfield was an Irish landowner, public official and soldier of the sixteenth century.

Sarsfield was from a wealthy merchant family, part of the Old English inhabitants of The Pale who remained Roman Catholic following the Reformation. Sarsfield served as Mayor of Dublin in 1566–1567. He was knighted in 1566 for his service against Shane O'Neill, the rebellious Gaelic lord of Tyrone.

He purchased estates at Tully Castle in County Kildare and Lucan Manor in County Dublin. He married Mabel FitzGerald, daughter of George FitzGerald of Tircroghan. He was the grandfather of Peter Sarsfield of Tully. His daughter Eleanor married Robert Dillon, Chief Justice of the Irish Common Pleas, thus allying the Sarsfields with another powerful family of the Pale.  Among his many other descendants was his great-great-grandson Patrick Sarsfield, who famously fought on the Jacobite side during the Williamite War in Ireland (1689–91).

References

Bibliography
 Wauchope, Piers. Patrick Sarsfield and the Williamite War. Irish Academic Press, 1992.

16th-century Irish people
People from County Dublin
Irish soldiers
Irish knights
Lord Mayors of Dublin
William
Year of birth unknown
Year of death unknown